These Leeds Rhinos players have either; won Challenge Cup, Rugby Football League Championship/Super League Grand Final, Yorkshire County Cup, Yorkshire League, played during Super League, or were international representatives before, or after, their time at Leeds.

A 

 Carl Ablett
 Matt Adamson circa-2000s
 Danny Allan
 Luke Ambler
 Kyle Amor
 Paul Anderson
 George Andrews circa-1920s

B 

 Éric Anselme circa-2000s
 Sam Backo
 James "Jim" Bacon circa-1920s
 Marcus Bai circa-2000s
 Billy Banks
 Dwayne Barker
 Edward "Ted" Barnard (#10) circa-1970
 David Barnhill circa-1990s
 Dean Bell circa-1990s
 Paul Bell circa-1990s
 Anthony "Tony" Binder circa-1970s
 John Wilkinson Birch circa-1900s
 Richie Blackmore circa-1990s
 Liam Botham circa-2000s
 Billy Bowen circa-1920s
 George Broughton Jr. (Junior) circa-1950s
 Jodie Broughton
 Archibald "Archie" Brown
 Gavin Brown circa-1990s
 Harold Buck circa-1920s
 Danny Buderus
 Luke Burgess
 Anthony "Tony" Burke circa-1980s
 John Burke
 Chris Burton
 Joe "Chimpy" Busch circa-1930s
 Tom Bush
 Ikram Butt

C 

 John "Dinny" Campbell circa-1910s
 Phil Cantillon
 Tonie Carroll circa-2000s
 Aubrey Casewell
 Leslie Chamberlain
 Joe Chandler
 Chris Chapman circa-1990s
 Chris Clarkson
 Geoffrey Clarkson
 Malcolm Clift
 Bradley Clyde circa-2000s
 Michael Coady
 Craig Coleman
 Wayne Collins circa-1990s
 Gary Connolly
 Mark Conway circa-1980s
 Bert Cook circa-1940s
 Ronald "Ron" Cowan, for Scotland (RU) while at Selkirk RFC (RU) 1961–62 5-caps (signed for Leeds 1962–63)
 Tony Currie

D 

 John Davies
 Brett Delaney
 Kevin Dick
 Paul Dixon
 Scott Donald
 Ewan Dowes circa-2000s
 Bill Drake
 Andrew Dunemann circa-2000s
 James "Jimmy" Dunn circa-1940s

E 

 Greg Eastwood
 Graham Eccles circa-1970s
 Morvin Edwards
 Andrew Ettingshausen
 Ken Eyre circa-1960s
 Esene Faimalo circa-1990s

F 

 James "Jim" Fallon circa-1990s
 Vince Fawcett circa-1980s
 Chris Feather circa-2000s
 Jamie Field circa-1990s
 Mike Forshaw circa-1990s
 Peter Fox
 Nick Fozzard circa-1990s
 Norman Francis circa-1980s
 Wally Fullerton Smith
 David Furner circa-2000s

G 

 John Gallager
 Tommy Gallagher
 Andrew "Andy" Gascoigne circa-1986
 Anthony Gibbons circa-1990s
 Carl Gibson
 Damian Gibson circa-1990s
 Marc Glanville circa-1990s
 Richard Goddard
 Brad Godden circa-1990s
 Jason Golden
 Marvin Golden circa-1990s
 Andy Goodway
 Andy Gregory
 Eric Grothe, Sr.

H 

 Neil Hague circa-1970s
 Michael Haley
 Carl Hall circa-1990s
 Ryan Hall
 Zak Hardaker
 Alan Hardisty
 Paul Harkin
 Neil Harmon circa-1990s
 Eric C. Harris (#2) circa-1932
 Phil Hassan circa-1990s
 Andy Hay circa-2000s
 Garry Hemingway circa-1950s
 Jonny Hepworth circa-2000s
 Cavill Heugh
 David Heselwood circa-1970s
 Vic Hey circa-1930s
 Merv Hicks
 Graham Holroyd circa-1990s
 Alan Horsfall circa-1940s
 Adam Hughes circa-1990s
 Brian Hughes circa-1970s
 David Hulme circa-1990s

I 

 Craig Innes circa-1990s

J 

 David James
 William James
 David Jenkins
 David "Dai" Morgan Jenkins circa-1930s
 Edgar Jones
 Iorwerth Jones
 Johnny Jones
 Ben Jones-Bishop

K 

 Ben Kaye circa-2000s
 John "Jack" Kelly 1930s...40s
 Andrew "Andy" Kirk circa-2000s
 Ian Kirke

L 

 Bob Landers
 Ali Lauitiiti
 Joseph Lavery circa-1910s
 Dean Lawford circa-1990s
 Jack Lendill circa-1950s
 Peter Lendill circa-1950s
 Kylie Leuluai
 Alan Lockwood circa-1960s
 James Lowes circa-1980s
 Cliff Lyons

M 

 Nathan McAvoy circa-2000s
 Wayne McDonald circa-2000s
 Wayne McDonald
 Danny McGuire
 Graham Mackay
 Chris McKenna circa-2000s
 Paul McShane
 Dane Manning
 Martin Masella circa-1990s
 Richard Mathers
 Jamie Mathiou circa-1990s
 Joe Mbu
 Robbie Mears circa-2000s
 Paul Medley circa-1980s
 Gary Mercer circa-1990s
 Shane Millard circa-2000s
 Sean Miller circa-1970s
 Jeff Moores circa-1920s...30s
 Ralph Morgan
 Steve Morris
 Gareth Morton circa-2000s
 Brett Mullins circa-2000s
 Bryan Murrell circa-1970s
 Scott Murrell

N 

 Terrence "Terry" Naylor circa-1970s
 Jason Netherton
 John "Jack" Newbound circa-1940s
 Samuel "Sam" Newbound circa-1930s

O 

 Mark O'Neill circa-2000s
 Frank O'Rourke circa-1920s
 Willie Oulton

P 

 Daniel Pascoe
 Jamie Peacock
 Nathan Picchi circa-1990s
 Stephen "Steve" Pitchford circa-1970s
 Jay Pitts
 Willie Poching circa-2000s
 Daryl Powell circa-1990s
 William "Billy" Pratt circa-1950s
 Paul Prendiville
 Bernard Prior circa-1950s

R 

 Michael Ratu
 Gareth Raynor
 Alan Rees
 George Rees
 Leroy Rivett circa-1990s
 Russell Robins
 Kenneth "Ken" Rollin
 Harold Rowe circa-1910s

S 

 Christopher "Chris" Sanderson circa-1970s
 Danny Sculthorpe
 Brian Shaw
 Ryan Sheridan circa-2000s
 Trevor Skerrett circa-1986
 Fred Smith
 Andy Speak circa-1990s
 Gary Spencer circa-1980s
 Johnny Swift circa-1950s

T 

 Alan Tait circa-1990s
 Jordan Tansey circa-2000s
 Jamie Thackray circa-2000s
 Ken Thornett circa-1960s
 Clinton Toopi circa-2000s
 David Tootill
 Peter Tunks
 Alex Turpin circa-2000s

V 

 Adrian Vowles circa-2000s

W 

 Anthony "Tony" Wainwright (#6) circa-1970 
 Ben Walker
 Joe Walsh
 Shaun Wane
 Danny Ward circa-2000s
 Dennis Warrior circa-1940s
 Kallum Watkins
 Frank Watson circa-1940s
 Brent Webb circa-2000s
 Evan Williams circa-1920s
 Arthur Wood (#9) circa-1954 
 Simon Worrall
 David "Dave" Wrench circa-1990s
 Thomas Wright, for Scotland (RU) while at Hawick RFC (RU) 1947 1-cap (signed for Leeds 1948–49)

Y 

 Dai Young

References 

Leeds Rhinos